The Twenty-seventh Legislature of Albania (Albanian: Legjislatura e njëzet e shtatë), officially known as the VI Pluralist Legislature of Albania (Albanian: Legjislatura e VI Pluraliste e Shqipërisë), was the legislature of Albania following the 2005 Albanian Parliamentary election of Members of Parliament (MPs) to the Albanian Parliament. The party of the Prime Minister Sali Berisha, PD, obtained majority of 80 deputies.

27th Legislature 

The two largest political parties in Albania are the Socialist Party (PS) and the Democratic Party (PD). Following is a list of political parties and alliances with representation in the Parliament by the 2005 elections.

MPS 
Deputies from the XVII session consisted of the following members:

Sources 

Legislatures of Albania